Mamun Al Mahtab (August 22, 1970) is a Bangladeshi hepatologist, medical scientist, author, and columnist. With 290 publications in national and international peer-reviewed journals to his credit, Mahtab is currently working as the Head, Division of Interventional Hepatology, Bangabandhu Sheikh Mujib Medical University (BSMMU). In 1998, he graduated from the University of London with an MSc in gastroenterology, and then in 2006, he obtained an MD in hepatology at Bangabandhu Sheikh Mujib Medical University(BSMMU).

Mahtab is the chief investigator for the GBPD060 clinical study of the Bangladesh-developed SARS-CoV-2 mRNA candidate. He is also the lead researcher on NASVAC's Phase I/II and III clinical studies. Mahtab was jointly awarded the ‘Premio Nacional' from the Cuban Academy of Sciences for the discovery of NASVAC in 2019. He organizes awareness-raising programs on liver diseases across the country in addition to inventing the NASVAC drug aiming to offer an effective solution to Hepatitis B at an affordable price for mass people in Bangladesh.

Early life and education
He spent his early life in Dhaka. His schooling started in Rosy Ann Centre, an English medium kindergarten. He subsequently switched to Banani Bidyaniketan and passed Secondary School Certificate examination in 1985. He completed Higher Secondary Certificate from Dhaka College in 1987.

He then moved to Mymensingh where he was admitted to the Mymensingh Medical College for his undergraduate medical studies. He got involved in student politics of Bangladesh Chatra League there. He was a member of the Central Committee (i.e. Mainuddin Hassan Choudhury - Iqbalur Rahim - Mahbububul Haque Shakil committee) of the organization.

Mahtab graduated from Mymensingh Medical College in 1995. He gained an MSc in Gastroenterology from the University of London in 1998 and subsequently did an MD in Hepatology at Bangabandhu Sheikh Mujib Medical University in 2006. He is a Fellow of the Royal College of Physicians of London, the Royal College of Physicians of Ireland, the Indian College of Physicians and the American College of Gastroenterology. Mahtab obtained Doctor of Philosophy from University of Malaya, Malaysia in 2021.

Career
Mahtab is currently working as the Head, Division of Interventional Hepatology, Bangabandhu Sheikh Mujib Medical University (BSMMU). He is the past chairman, Department of Hepatology of the same university. He worked as visiting professor at the Department of Gastroenterology & Metabology, Ehime University, Japan and Member, Board of Studies, Department of Gastroenterology, All India Institute of Medical Sciences, Rishikesh, India. He is member of the Strategic & Technical Advisory Group on Viral Hepatitis of World Health Organization-South-East Asia Region.

Mahtab is a PhD thesis co-supervisor and PhD examiner at the University of Malaya, Malaysia, Tehran University, Iran, University of Madras and Dr. A P J Abul Kalam Technical University, India and University of Dhaka and Rajshahi University in Bangladesh.

He is member of Asian Pacific Association for the Study of the Liver (APASL) Working Parties on hepatitis B, hepatitis C, acute on chronic liver failure and liver fibrosis, hepatitis B virus in pregnancy, Budd Chiari Syndrome and APASL COVID Task Force.

Mahtab is also a member of Regional Expert Panel on NAFLD/NASH and Survey Lead for Bangladesh of Global NAFLD Policy Review of European Association for the Study of the Liver (EASL).

Research 
Mahtab is the principal investigator of the phase-I/II and III clinical trials of NASVAC, a new generic for chronic hepatitis B, which is already registered in Bangladesh, Cuba, Nicaragua, Ecuador, Belarus and Angola. It is the first drug to be developed and registered in Bangladesh. NASVAC is also the ‘first novel molecule’ to be registered by the Directorate General of Drug Administration of the Bangladesh Government.

Mahtab is the principal investigator of the clinical trial of GBPD060, the SARS-CoV-2 mRNA vaccine candidate, developed in Bangladesh.

Publications 
Mahtab has compiled six books, namely ‘Liver: A Complete Book on Hepato-Pancreato-Biliary Diseases’, published by Elsevier (2009), ’Comprehensive Text Book on Hepatitis B’, published by Jaypee (2010), ‘Fatty Liver Disease’ (2012) and 'Hepatitis Management Update' (2015) published by McMillan and 'Text Book of Hepato-Gastroenterology' (2015) and 'Practical Hepato-Gastroenterology Prescriber' (2016) published by Jaypee.

He has more than 290 publications in international and national peer reviewed scientific journals. During the ongoing COVID-19 pandemic, he has published to date 19 scientific articles related to COVID-19. He has more than 350 international and national scientific conference talks to his credit.

Mahtab is serving on the Editorial Boards of several international journals in the fields of Hepatology and Gastroenterology including, Euro-Asian Journal of Hepato-Gastroenterology (Journal of Euro-Asian Gastroenterological Association) (Co-Editor-in-Chief), Hepatology International (journal of Asian Pacific Association for the Study of the Liver) (Associate Editor) and Journal of Clinical, Experimental Hepatology (journal of Indian Association for the Study of the Liver) (Editorial Board Member), Hepatitis B Annual (Kalinga Gastroenterology Foundation, India) (Co-Editor-in-Chief) to name a few.

He has published Bengali translations of 'White House Years: The Tilt-The India-Pakistan Crisis of 1971' (পাক ভারত যুদ্ধ ১৯৭১) (1993) by Henry Kissinger and 'Victory in Bangladesh' (একাত্তরের বিজয়) (1994) by Major General (Retd.) Lachman Singh. He has recently published four Bengali books, namely ‘Shekal Ekaler Korcha’ (সেকাল একালের কড়চা) (2018) ‘Ekhon Shomoy Bangladesher’ (এখন সময় বাংলাদেশের) (2019), ‘Poth Harabe Na Bangladesh (পথ হারাবে না বাংলাদেশে) (2020), ‘Bangabandhu, Muktijudhdha and Bangladesh’ (বঙ্গবন্ধু, মুক্তিযুদ্ধ ও বাংলাদেশ) (2021) from Mawla Brothers and ‘Liver Chikitshae Notun Sombhabona’(লিভার চিকিৎসায় নতুন সম্ভাবনা) (2018) from Mutkodhara, which are leading publication houses of the country.

Awards 
1.‘Premio Nacional’ from Cuban Academy of Sciences in 2019

2.“Order of Merit” from Euro-Asian Gastroenterological Association (2014)

3."Blumberg Oration 2015" conferred by Kalinga Gastroenterology Foundation, India, (2016)

4."Distinguished Scientist (Hepatology) Award" from Venus Research Foundation, India (2016)

5.“Albert Nelson Marquis Life Time Achievement Award” (2018) from Marquis Who's Who

6.“Bishuddhananda Gold Medal” from Bangladesh Bouddha Krishty Prochar Songho (2018)

Mahtab has received several awards for his contribution during COVID-19 pandemic including ‘Health Care Heroes Award 2020’ from Walton Group, Bangladesh, ‘Global Business CSR Award 2021’ from Bangladesh American Chamber of Commerce & Youth Commerce Communication International, ‘Wonca Global Healthcare Leadership Award 2021’ from World Organization of Family Physicians (Wonca), ‘COVID-19 Hero Award’ from Rotary International Zone 1B, Region 10.

Affiliations 
He is four times elected Secretary General of Association for the Study of the Liver Diseases Bangladesh (ASLDB) (the national Hepatology Association of Bangladesh). He is also founder President of Bangabandhu Sheikh Mujib Medical University Hepatology Alumni Association and Executive Chairman of Forum for the Study of the Liver Bangladesh.

He is the founder General Secretary of Bangladesh Stem Cell and Regenerative Medicine Society.

He has organized several ‘first time in Bangladesh’ medical conferences including the first STEMCON in 2017 (1st international conference on stem cell therapy in Bangladesh) and first EndoVasculoCon in 2019 (1st live conference from endoscopy suit and vascular lab in the region).

Mahtab played key role in organizing the First Padma-Ganga-Gomti Liver Conference 2019 at Bangabandhu Sheikh Mujib Medical University in Dhaka. This is the first ever scientific conference of only Bengali Hepatologists. The conference was jointly organized by Forum for the Study of the Liver Bangladesh, Liver Foundation West Bengal and Hepatitis Foundation of Tripura. It was organized as a token of respect of the Bengali Hepatologists to Bangabandhu Sheikh Mujibur Rahman.

Mahtab is the Vice President of Euroasian Gastroenterological Association, Secretary General of South Asian Association for the Study of the Liver (SAASL) and International Coordinator of Indian National Association for the Study of the Liver (INASL).

Mahtab is member of the APASL Working Parties on hepatitis B, Hepatitis C, acute on chronic liver failure (ACLF), Budd Chiari Syndrome and liver fibrosis. He is a member of the Steering Committee of the Patient Registry of Hepatitis Free Pahang Society, Malaysia.

He is only Bangladeshi Hepatologists who proclaimed June 12 as ‘International NASH Day’ through a joint deceleration released simultaneously from London, Paris and New York in 2018.

He is Member Secretary of Sampritee Bangladesh, Treasurer of Forum for Secular Bangladesh and Executive Member of Dhaka City North Awami League. Mahtab was Councilor at the 21st National Council of the party in 2016 and 2019.

Personal life 
Mahtab comes from Sylhet. He is married to Dr. Nuzhat Choudhury. They have two children. His father late Mahtab Uddin Ahmed was a civil engineer of Bangladesh. He served the Government of Bangladesh in the capacity of Chief Engineer, Roads & Highways Department. His mother Mrs. Ayesha Mahtab is a house wife.

References

1970 births
Alumni of the University of London
Bangladeshi hepatologists
Fellows of the Royal College of Physicians of Ireland
Fellows of the Royal College of Physicians
Living people
People from Sylhet